Brigid 'Biddy' O'Sullivan is a former camogie player; winner of the B+I Star of the Year award in 1988 and of eight All Ireland medals with Kilkenny.

References

Living people
Kilkenny camogie players
Year of birth missing (living people)